The 2005 Men's World Open Squash Championship is the men's edition of the World Open, which serves as the individual world championship for squash players. The event took place in Hong Kong from 29 November to 4 December 2005. Amr Shabana won his second World Open title, defeating David Palmer in the final.

Ranking points
In 2005, the points breakdown were as follows:

Seeds

Draws & Results

See also
World Open
2005 Women's World Open Squash Championship
2005 Men's World Team Squash Championships

References

World Squash Championships
W
2005 in Hong Kong sport
Squash tournaments in Hong Kong
International sports competitions hosted by Hong Kong